The 2022 San Diego Open was a combined men's and women's tennis tournament played on outdoor hard courts. It was the 2nd edition of the event for the men and the 1st edition of the Southern California Open for the women since 2015. The event is part of the ATP Tour 250 series of the 2022 ATP Tour and a WTA 500 event on the 2022 WTA Tour. It was held at the Barnes Tennis Center in San Diego, United States, from September 19 through September 25, 2022 for the men, and from October 10 through October 16, 2022 for the women.

The event was primarily organized being held on a second consecutive year in the alternative sporting calendar due to the cancellation of tournaments in China during the 2022 season because of the ongoing COVID-19 pandemic, as well as the WTA's suspension of tournaments in China following former WTA player Peng Shuai's allegation of sexual assault against a Chinese government official.

Champions

Men's singles 

  Brandon Nakashima def.  Marcos Giron, 6–4, 6–4

Women's singles 

  Iga Świątek def.  Donna Vekić, 6–3, 3–6, 6–0

This is Świątek's eighth title of the year and eleventh of her career.

Men's doubles 

  Nathaniel Lammons /  Jackson Withrow def.  Jason Kubler /  Luke Saville, 7–6(7–5), 6–2

Women's doubles 

  Coco Gauff /  Jessica Pegula def.  Gabriela Dabrowski /  Giuliana Olmos, 1–6, 7–5, [10–4]

ATP singles main-draw entrants

Seeds

1 Rankings are as of September 12, 2022.

Other entrants
The following players received wildcards into the main draw:
  Brandon Holt
  Zachary Svajda
  Fernando Verdasco

The following players received entry from the qualifying draw:
  Christopher Eubanks
  Mitchell Krueger
  Facundo Mena
  Emilio Nava

Withdrawals
Before the tournament
  Daniel Altmaier → replaced by  Jason Kubler
  Cristian Garín → replaced by  Steve Johnson
  Kwon Soon-woo → replaced by  Stefan Kozlov
  Jiří Veselý → replaced by  Christopher O'Connell

ATP doubles main-draw entrants

Seeds

1 Rankings are as of September 12, 2022.

Other entrants
The following pairs received wildcards into the doubles main draw:
  Bradley Klahn /  Fernando Verdasco 
  Keegan Smith /  Sem Verbeek

The following pair received entry as alternates:
  Jonathan Eysseric /  Artem Sitak

Withdrawals
  William Blumberg /  Alejandro Tabilo → replaced by  Evan King /  Denis Kudla 
  Robert Galloway /  Alex Lawson → replaced by  Jonathan Eysseric /  Artem Sitak 
  Cristian Garín /  Hans Hach Verdugo → replaced by  Hans Hach Verdugo /  Treat Huey 
  Max Purcell /  Luke Saville → replaced by  Jason Kubler /  Luke Saville

WTA singles main-draw entrants

Seeds

1 Rankings are as of October 3, 2022.

Other entrants
The following players received wildcards into the main draw:
  Leylah Fernandez
  Maria Sakkari
  Sloane Stephens
  CoCo Vandeweghe

The following players used a protected ranking to enter the main draw:
  Bianca Andreescu
  Sofia Kenin

The following players received entry from the qualifying draw:
  Louisa Chirico
  Caroline Dolehide
  Robin Montgomery
  Camila Osorio
  Ellen Perez
  Donna Vekić

The following players received entry as lucky losers:
  Jil Teichmann
  Zheng Qinwen

Withdrawals
  Beatriz Haddad Maia → replaced by  Liudmila Samsonova
  Anett Kontaveit → replaced by  Bianca Andreescu
  Veronika Kudermetova → replaced by  Jil Teichmann
  Petra Kvitová → replaced by  Martina Trevisan
  Jeļena Ostapenko → replaced by  Alison Riske-Amritraj
  Elena Rybakina → replaced by  Zheng Qinwen

WTA doubles main-draw entrants

Seeds

1 Rankings are as of October 3, 2022.

Other entrants
The following pair received a wildcard into the doubles main draw:
  Alyssa Ahn /  Katherine Hui

Withdrawals
  Anna Danilina /  Beatriz Haddad Maia → replaced by  Anna Danilina /  Aliaksandra Sasnovich

References

External links

2022 ATP Tour
2022 WTA Tour
Tennis tournaments in the United States
September 2022 sports events in the United States
October 2022 sports events in the United States
2022 in American tennis